The Intermodal Surface Transportation Efficiency Act of 1991 (ISTEA, pronounced Ice-Tea) is a United States federal law that posed a major change to transportation planning and policy, as the first U.S. federal legislation on the subject in the post-Interstate Highway System era.

Objective
The act presented an overall intermodal approach to highway and transit funding with collaborative planning requirements, giving significant additional powers to metropolitan planning organizations (MPOs). The bill was preceded by the Surface Transportation and Uniform Relocation Assistance Act in 1987 and followed by the Transportation Equity Act for the 21st Century (TEA-21) in 1998, the Safe, Accountable, Flexible, Efficient Transportation Equity Act: A Legacy for Users (SAFETEA-LU) in 2005, the Moving Ahead for Progress in the 21st Century Act (MAP-21) in 2012, the FIxing America's Surface Transportation Act (FAST) in 2015, and the Infrastructure Investment and Jobs Act in 2021.

ISTEA also provided funds for the conversion of dormant railroad corridors into rail trails; the first rail trail to be funded was the Cedar Lake Regional Rail Trail, in Minneapolis, Minnesota.

High priority corridors
Section 1105 of the act also defines a number of High Priority Corridors, to be part of the National Highway System. After various amendments in subsequent transportation bills and other legislation, this is a list of the corridors:

High-speed rail corridors

The legislation also called for the designation of up to five high-speed rail corridors. The options were studied for several months, and announced in October 1992. The first four were announced by United States Secretary of Transportation Andrew Card, while the last was announced by Federal Railroad Administration head Gil Carmichael.

October 15, 1992: The Midwest high-speed rail corridor with three links from Chicago, Illinois to Detroit, Michigan, St. Louis, Missouri, and Milwaukee, Wisconsin.
October 16, 1992: The Florida high-speed rail corridor linking Miami with Orlando and Tampa.
October 19, 1992: The California high-speed rail corridor linking San Diego and Los Angeles with the San Francisco Bay Area and Sacramento via the San Joaquin Valley.
October 20, 1992: The Southeast high-speed rail corridor connecting Charlotte, North Carolina, Richmond, Virginia, and Washington, D.C.
October 20, 1992: The Pacific Northwest high-speed rail corridor linking Eugene and Portland, Oregon with Seattle, Washington and Vancouver, British Columbia, Canada.

However, there was not significant funding attached to these announcements: $30 million had been allocated to several states by 1997 to improve grade crossings, but that was a very tiny amount in comparison to the billions required for a true high-speed network. Aside from a few places in California and the Chicago–Detroit Line, most areas outside the Northeast Corridor continued to be limited to  until $8 billion from the American Recovery and Reinvestment Act of 2009 was distributed in January 2010.

Jeff Morales one of the principal drafters of this bill, is currently serving as CEO of the California High-Speed Rail Authority, which is currently constructing a high-speed rail line along the route originally proposed in this bill.

Airbags
The Intermodal Surface Transportation Efficiency Act of 1991 also mandated that passenger automobiles and light trucks built after September 1, 1998, to have airbags installed as standard equipment for the driver and the right front passenger.

Notes

References

External links
 Intermodal Surface Transportation Efficiency Act of 1991 as amended (PDF/details) in the GPO Statute Compilations collection
 Intermodal Surface Transportation Efficiency Act of 1991 as enacted (details) in the US Statutes at Large
H.R.2950 - Intermodal Surface Transportation Efficiency Act of 1991 on Congress.gov
A Guide to Metropolitan Transportation Planning Under ISTEA - How the Pieces Fit Together (USDOT) 

United States federal transportation legislation
United States railroad regulation
1991 in rail transport
1992 in rail transport
102nd United States Congress
High-speed rail in the United States
Airbags
1991 in American law